Featherstonhaugh (also spelt Fetherstonhaugh and Featherstonehaugh) is an English surname.

Notable people with this surname include:

 Francis Fetherston ( – after 1624), an English statesman
 George William Featherstonhaugh (1780–1866), an English-American geologist
 George W. Featherstonhaugh Jr. (1814–1900), an American legislator and businessman
 Godfrey Fetherstonhaugh (1859–1928), an Irish politician
 F. B. Fetherstonhaugh (1863–1945), a Canadian patent lawyer
 Constance Featherstonhaugh (later Benson; 1864–1946), an English actress
 Francis Featherstonhaugh Johnston (1891–1963), an Anglican bishop of Egypt
 Harold Lea Fetherstonhaugh (1887–1971), a Canadian architect
 Buddy Featherstonhaugh (1909–1976), an English jazz saxophonist
 Mary Featherstonhaugh Frampton (1928–2014), an English civil servant
 Robert Fetherstonhaugh (born 1932), an English cricketer
 Alexander Featherstonhaugh Wylie (born 1951), a judge of the Supreme Courts of Scotland

Fetherstonhaugh baronets (1747)
Sir Matthew Fetherstonhaugh (1714–1774), 1st Baronet
Sir Henry Fetherstonhaugh, known as Harry (1754–1846), 2nd Baronet

Artistic and fictional works
The Featherstonehaughs, a British dance company
"Cholmondeley Featherstonehaugh", an episode of the TV series Nanny and the Professor
Stanley Featherstonehaugh Ukridge, a fictional character in the short stories of P. G. Wodehouse
Marcus Featherstone's terrier "Foon" ("written 'Featherstonehaugh' ") in the detective novel Police at the Funeral by Margery Allingham (1931)
Harry Featherstonhaugh in the Lady Hardcastle Mystery Books by T.E. Kinsey.

See also
Fanshawe (disambiguation) (a normalized spelling of the same name)
Featherstone Castle
Featherstone (disambiguation)
List of irregularly spelled English names
List of irregularly spelt places in the United Kingdom

References

English toponymic surnames